Xiao Xiao is an Internet Flash cartoon series by Chinese animator Zhu Zhiqiang, featuring stick figures performing choreographed fight scenes. Some of the cartoons are interactive and game-like. All cartoons are in the Adobe Flash format, with the exception of Xiao Xiao #1, which was originally in AVI format and converted to Flash format.

"Xiao Xiao" literally is the Chinese character for "small" repeated twice in Mandarin Chinese; here this reduplication connotes an affectionate diminutive, an equivalent might be the English expression "itty bitty" or "lil' old". Each Xiao Xiao cartoon is given a Chinese title with the adjective "Xiao Xiao" preceding a descriptive noun phrase. Xiao Xiao #1 was originally titled "Xiao Xiao Zuo Pin", which translates to "A Little Bit of Creative Work". Since then each Xiao Xiao cartoon has had a different noun succeeding "Xiao Xiao". #4 is titled "Little Sheriff", and #7 is titled "Little Movie".

The term has gradually shifted meaning from the cartoons themselves to the main character, an anonymous black stick-figure. In this context it means something akin to "little fella", appropriate since in most perspectives Xiao Xiao and his fellow stick-people appear tiny and childlike, with disproportionately large heads and small limbs.

Xiao Xiao is placed in various dangerous situations to prove his martial arts prowess, often against other stick figures who appear more or less identical to himself. Usually other stick figures are also black, but can be other colors, and Xiao Xiao's perpetual nemesis is the Boss, a purple stick figure who commands the enemy sticks and appears to be Xiao Xiao's only peer in ability.

Others have seized on Xiao Xiao's popularity to make animations exploiting the easy-to-draw style of stick figures and minimalist backgrounds, often creating cartoons that are sequels or takeoffs of the official Xiao Xiao cartoons, especially Xiao Xiao #3.

Episodes

 Xiao Xiao #1 is a simple fight between two stick-figure men, parodying the look of Hong Kong martial arts films by taking the level of violence in the fight to extremes.
 Xiao Xiao #2 adds interactivity; the stick-man (Xiao Xiao) faces a series of physical challenges, the outcomes of which depend on the player's timing. The game contains many features that would later become a staple of the Xiao Xiao series, including revamped animation and character design, most notable the introduction of the series' main antagonist, "The Boss" (although he is not referred to by name until Xiao Xiao #3), a magenta-colored crime boss who acts as the final challenge of the game via a boss fight.
 Xiao Xiao #3 is a kung-fu style fight scene in a simple line-drawn building; Xiao Xiao faces off against a seemingly endless series of stick-man opponents (actually around forty enemies) using fast-paced martial arts moves; the simple background, two-dimensional movement, vanishing corpses and regenerating enemies call to mind side-scrolling games. The encounter ends in a final showdown between Xiao Xiao and a purple stick-man labeled "Boss" (another video game reference) in a fight that parodies multiple scenes from The Matrix (especially Xiao Xiao's last move, a slow-motion air kick which resembles that of Trinity at the beginning of the movie as well as using a sound clip straight from the movie). The visual theme of Xiao Xiao, a plain black stick-man, fighting against a purple stick-man Boss, remains constant throughout the series. This is the best known Xiao Xiao animation, and has been shown on MTV. This Xiao Xiao is one of the more famous and thought of as the one hardest worked on, and is noted to be one of "the original stick fighting flash movies", and sets the bar for the many stick flash movies.
 Xiao Xiao #4 is an interactive first-person shooting game in the style of Virtua Cop, casting the player as Xiao Xiao in the role of a Western-style sheriff complete with cowboy hat and six-shooter. It ends with another scripted fight scene with the purple Boss (which parodies another scene from The Matrix). 
 Xiao Xiao #5, billed as a "Battle to the death... and beyond", returns to the two-dimensional fighting-game-reminiscent side-view style of #3. This time, Xiao Xiao and the Boss duel using various conventions from anime and manga, exhibiting supernatural powers such as the use of magic spells, the ability to pull weapons out of hammerspace and to continue their battle through astral travel after death. It is notable for its comedic ending, where an ambulance shows up in the middle of the fight, taking the two characters' dead bodies away. The two look at one another, then both run after the ambulance.
 Xiao Xiao #6 returns to Xiao Xiao #2's style, but this time with a bit more of a plot, forcing the player to button-mash Xiao-Xiao through a barroom brawl.
 Xiao Xiao #7 and #8 are the most elaborate of the animations, forsaking the side-view of previous Xiao Xiaos for a fully three-dimensional, cinematic camera view throughout. Once again riffing on films like The Matrix, they depict Xiao Xiao's infiltration of the Boss's mansion and his pursuit after the Boss escapes. #8 ends with a "To Be Continued" message and has yet to have a sequel, though given that the ending is a bit of an anticlimax, and that two more flashes unrelated to this one came out after it, the message may have been ironic.
 Xiao Xiao #9, a departure from the rest of the series, is a fully interactive beat em up game in the style of Final Fight and Streets of Rage where Xiao Xiao uses Guy's moves. Rather than a plain, pen-and-ink background, the background is this time a full-color, realistic re-creation of a desk ostensibly intended to be Zhu's (the computer monitor has a screenshot of Xiao Xiao #3). As with other Xiao Xiaos and the original beat-em-ups that helped inspire them, Xiao Xiao must fight through a series of purple stick-thugs before confronting the Boss.
 Xiao Xiao Beer Ad #1 appears to have been created by Zhu as a Chinese advertisement for Heineken beer. This one is one of the more recent movies and also is the first to feature eyes and facial expressions on the stick figures. The movie starts with odd coding lines moving down the screen in a style similar to the matrix, and then it zooms in on a Heineken Beer bottle. The scene then changes to the original black Xiao Xiao holding a Heineken Beer Bottle and a bo-staff. Suddenly, some enemy stick figures appear and try to steal his beer. Xiao Xiao fights them off with his staff in an action packed fight scene, while keeping the bottle safe. After the second to last grunt falls, one last one appears and attempts to shoot him with a pistol. Xiao Xiao proceeds to skillfully dodge the bullets and then strike the ground with his staff, causing a massive crevice to crack open in the earth and the foe falls right in. The movie ends with Xiao Xiao holding up the bottle and smiling, then it shifts to a Heineken advertisement saying "Get Connected, Heineken."
 Xiao Xiao Beer Ad #2 is the sequel to Xiao Xiao Beer Ad #1 and uses the same style, as well as picks up immediately where the last one left off. It also appears to be a Chinese Heineken Beer advertisement as well. After the one enemy stick figure falls into the crevice, he then jumps out, hinting that he must be the Boss. This one then proceeds to create physical doubles of himself in a manner similar to Naruto's Shadow Clone. The stick figure and his doubles then charge toward Xiao Xiao. He then fights off the enemy stick figures with his staff and slays every last one of them. After the last one is defeated, a car drives by him. Xiao Xiao scratches the side of the car with his staff. A stick figure then emerges from the back door, and he slams him down immediately. After that, Xiao Xiao proceeds to drop the staff and fly into the air, Superman style, and then lands on top of a giant Heineken Beer bottle. At the end, the scene once again shifts to a Heineken advertisement saying "Get Connected, Heineken," but with Xiao Xiao standing heroically on top of the bottle.
 Xiao Xiao Cityplaza or Xiao Xiao: Mall Brawl appears to have been created by Zhu as an advertisement for the CityPlaza mall in Hong Kong; it is an altered version of Xiao Xiao #3 wherein the main character/hero is a red stickman (to match the CityPlaza logo) and the background has been embellished to make it resemble the inside of a shopping mall. The original black Xiao Xiao making a cameo appearance for a short while. He is in the background and doesn't fight, but simply rides past on a pair of ice skates. Also, a scene from Xiao Xiao #3 is also playing on the TV during the fight. Contrary to belief, Xiao Xiao was not initially aired on MTV, but originally was viewed on the Flash animation super community known as Newgrounds.

Characters 
Xiao Xiao Xiao Xiao is the protagonist of the series. He is a martial arts expert, as well as an elite assassin. His skills are unmatched, and the only person who comes close is the Boss.
Bad Boss Bad Boss is another martial artist, and appears to be some sort of gang leader and the main antagonist of the series. He is the only one who can give Xiao Xiao a decent fight, and has been beaten by Xiao Xiao on multiple occasions. His name is a reference to most video games, in which a very difficult character near the end is called a boss. The Boss usually appears in magenta.
The gangs Various-colored stick figures who are beat down by Xiao in a matter of seconds.

Legal dispute
In June 2004, Zhu filed a lawsuit against Nike for plagiarizing his cartoon stickmen in their commercials. Nike's representatives denied the accusations, claiming that the stickman figure lacks originality, and is public domain. Zhu eventually won the lawsuit, claiming his copyright on his style and not the stickman, and Nike was ordered to pay $36,000 to the cartoonist.

References

External links
 Xiao Xiao collection on Newgrounds
 Zhu at Newgrounds
 Xiao Xiao collection on Stickpage

Internet memes
Chinese adult animated action television series
Flash animated web series
Browser-based game websites
Animated web series